Two ships of the Royal Navy have been named HMS Matchless:

  was an  launched in 1914 and sold in 1921.
  was an M-class destroyer launched in 1941, sold to the Turkish Navy in 1959 and renamed Kılıç Ali Paşa, and decommissioned in 1970.

Royal Navy ship names